The list of museums in Alabama contains museums in the U.S. state of Alabama.  A number of public and private institutions and organizations around the state make their collections available for public viewing.  These museums contain artifacts and exhibits related to art and art history, broadcasting, children, civil and political rights, culture, industry, law, medicine, military history, music, natural history, local and regional history, science, sports and transportation.  Additionally, the state is home to many historic house museums, many with a focus on the biographical history of individuals; several hall of fames; and a number of living history museums with a focus on local, state, or national history. Also included are non-profit and university art galleries. Museums that exist only in cyberspace (i.e., virtual museums) are not included in this list.



Active museums

Defunct museums

 Carlen House, Mobile
 George and Lurleen Wallace Museum, Montgomery, dedicated to the lives of former Alabama governor's George Wallace and Lurleen B. Wallace
 Ma'Cille's Museum of Miscellanea, Gordo, article
 Magee Farm, Kushla, closed in 2010
 Red Mountain Museum, Birmingham
 Tom Mann's Fish World, Eufaula, closed in 2004
 The Water Course, Clanton, closed in 2012

See also
 List of museums in the United States
 Nature centers in Alabama

References

External links

Alabama Museums Association
Guide to Alabama Museums

Alabama
Museums
Museums